Estopiñán del Castillo, in Ribagorçan: Estopanyà (in ) is a municipality located in the province of Huesca, Aragon, Spain. According to the 2004 census (INE), the municipality had a population of 217 inhabitants.

In this municipality, the inhabitants speaks a variety transition of Catalan and Aragonese languages, called Ribagorçan.

References

External links
Estopiñán del Castillo on CAI Aragón (Spanish)
Church of Estopiñán del Castillo on Romanico aragonés (Spanish)

Municipalities in the Province of Huesca